Preša is a village in the Municipality of Majšperk in northeastern Slovenia. It lies southwest of Breg, along the road from Rogatec to Majšperk in the valley of Skralska Creek, a minor right tributary of the Dravinja River. The area is part of the traditional region of Styria. It is now included with the rest of the municipality in the Drava Statistical Region.

Geography

In the valley there are mostly meadows and fields, on the slopes there are some vineyards and orchards, and higher up there are forests.

References

External links
Preša at Geopedia

Populated places in the Municipality of Majšperk